Finkbiner Building, also known as Finkbiner Transfer and Storage Co. and Olive Place Lofts, is a historic warehouse building located at Springfield, Missouri, United States. Built about 1925, it is a large two story commercial warehouse, with load-bearing brick walls and a flat roof.  It has a cubic form and a roughly wedge-shaped footprint.

It was listed on the National Register of Historic Places in 2005.

References

Commercial buildings on the National Register of Historic Places in Missouri
Commercial buildings completed in 1925
Buildings and structures in Springfield, Missouri
National Register of Historic Places in Greene County, Missouri